Kṣirodaksayi Vishnu  is a form of the Hindu god Vishnu. As the Paramatma (Ultimate Soul), he is described to "enter every atom and the heart of all beings as a witness, and gives remembrance, knowledge and forgetfulness”.

In Gauḍīya Vaishnavism, a school of Vaishṇavism, the Sātvata-tantra describes three different forms, or aspects, of Vishnu as Mahavishnu also known as Karnodakshayi Vishnu (The form from whose breath the multiverse is born and from whose inhalation,whole multiverse of matter is drawn and engulfed), Garbhodakśayī-Viṣṇu and Kṣīrodakaśāyī Vishnu (Each universe has Garbhodakśayī-Viṣṇu as  its base and Kṣīrodakaśāyī-Viṣṇu in every matter particles as a copied version) Kṣīrodakaśāyī-Viṣṇu resides in the heart of every living creature as a four hand expansion similar to that of Mahāviṣṇu. He is also referred to as the Paramātmā, or super soul. His abode is Vaikunṭha. His personal abode is the Kshira Sagara (Ocean of Condensed Milk) and he is realised as the Aniruddha expansion of Narayana.

Sattva Guṇa
Viṣhṇu. or the deity of the quality of goodness in the material world, is the puruṣāvatāra known as Kṣīrodakaśāyī Viṣṇu or Paramātmā. Sattva Guna is also considered par above the other two qualities or natural tendencies.The quality possesed by the Lord Vishnu in itself is supreme and considered to be nature of every soul in mortal world,it works by increasing goodness and righteousness in a being.It depends on the being that it listens to it or just ignore it.

See also

Garbhodaksayi Vishnu
Mahāviṣṇu
Nārāyaṇa

Samudra Manthana
Sattva
Viṣṇu

References 

A.C. Bhaktivedanta Svamī Prabhupāda. The Quest for Enlightenment. Los Angeles. Hard Cover 1997

Forms of Vishnu
Vedanta